Pascal Thüler (born 10 January 1970) is a retired Swiss football defender.

References

1970 births
Living people
Swiss men's footballers
FC St. Gallen players
Grasshopper Club Zürich players
MSV Duisburg players
SW Bregenz players
FC Vaduz players
Swiss expatriate sportspeople in Liechtenstein
Expatriate footballers in Liechtenstein
FC Kreuzlingen players
Association football defenders
Swiss Super League players
Switzerland under-21 international footballers
Switzerland international footballers
Swiss expatriate footballers
Expatriate footballers in Germany
Swiss expatriate sportspeople in Germany
Expatriate footballers in Austria
Swiss expatriate sportspeople in Austria
Austrian Football Bundesliga players